Vernier Valley is an ice-free valley on the east side of Mount Blackwelder in the northeast part of Wilkniss Mountains, Victoria Land. The name is one of a group in the area associated with surveying applied in 1993 by New Zealand Geographic Board (NZGB); vernier being a graduated scale used on measuring instruments to allow the reading of finer subdivisions.

Valleys of Victoria Land
Scott Coast